Le Grand-Quevilly  is a commune in the Seine-Maritime department in the Normandy region in north-western France.

Geography

Population

Heraldry

Places of interest
 The Zénith de Rouen concert hall.
 The fifteenth-century manor house at Grand Aulnay.
 The church of Saint-Pierre, dating from the sixteenth century.

International relations

Le Grand-Quevilly is twinned with:
  Ness Ziona, Israel since 1964,
  Morondava, Madagascar, since 1964,
  Laatzen, Germany, since 1966,
  Lévis, Canada, since 1969,
  Hinckley, England since 1976.

Notable people
 Laurent Fabius, politician.
 Franck Dubosc, actor and comedian.
 Philippe Torreton, actor and politician

See also
Communes of the Seine-Maritime department

References

External links

Official website 

Communes of Seine-Maritime